Alexander Search is an English language Portuguese indie pop / indie rock band, formed in Lisbon, by pianist Júlio Resende and singer Salvador Sobral in late-2016.

"Alexander Search" was one of the many heteronyms used by 20th Century Portuguese author Fernando Pessoa. Search, a literary persona/pseudonym created by the author during his teenage years, wrote mainly in English (Pessoa would later switch to writing exclusively in his native Portuguese language).

The band pays tribute to the work of Fernando Pessoa by adopting his pseudonym's name and playing original indie pop/rock songs built around his poetry. Also in the same spirit, each of the band's members adopted pseudonyms.

Alexander Search's self-titled debut album was released in June 2017, peaking at number 3 in the Portuguese charts.

Members 
Salvador Sobral, "Benjamin Cymbra" – vocals (2016–2020)
Júlio Resende, "Augustus Search" – keyboards, piano (2016–present)
Daniel Neto, "Marvel K." – electric guitar (2016–present)
André Nascimento, "Sgt. William Byng" – electronics, keyboards (2016–present)
Joel Silva, "Mr. Tagus" – drums, percussion (2016–present)

Discography

Studio albums

References

External links
 

Portuguese rock music groups
Portuguese indie rock groups